Johannes Enzenhofer (born 4 October 1965) is an athlete from Austria.  He competes in triathlon.

Enzenhofer competed at the first Olympic triathlon at the 2000 Summer Olympics.  He took 29th place with a total time of 1:51:02.48.

References

Austrian male triathletes
Triathletes at the 2000 Summer Olympics
1965 births
Living people
Olympic triathletes of Austria